Abdou Cherif (also Abdou Chrif, Abdo Sheriff, Abdo Shrif, Abdo Sharif) is a singer native of the Moroccan city of Casablanca. Abdou Cherif is the nephew of Abdelwahab Agoumi, one of the most influential artist in the modernization of Moroccan classical music in the 50s. Following the teachings of his mentor Mahmoud Saâdi  (co-founder of the musical phenomenon of the 70s which gave birth to the well-known groups of popular music Nass El Ghiwane and Jil Jilala), Abdou Cherif saw his dream come true in 1999: to sing at the Khédival Cairo opera house in front of the public of his idol Abdelhalim Hafez. Egyptians gave him the nickname of "the New Nightingale", in reference to the "Brown Nightingale" Abdelhalim Hafez.
He is also referred by the Moroccan public as a crooner.

Notes

References 
 Mahmoud, Saâdi, Yabiladi.com 
 Abdou Cherif celebrating the Valentine's day at the Cairo Opera House, Youm 7 News paper
 Décoration du Rebab d'Or 
 Lavieeco : Abdou Cherif, idole de l'Egypte
 Le Matin : En concert unique à Casablanca : Abdou Chérif fait un triomphe
 Leconomiste: Abdou Cherif: Pour rendre votre vie plus rose!

External links 

 

Year of birth missing (living people)
Living people
People from Casablanca
20th-century Moroccan male singers